Tomaszowice  is a village in the administrative district of Gmina Wielka Wieś, within Kraków County, Lesser Poland Voivodeship, in southern Poland. The village is located in the historical region Galicia.

References

Tomaszowice